Pope Cyril of Alexandria may refer to:

 Cyril of Alexandria, ruled in 412–444
 Pope Cyril II of Alexandria, ruled in 1078–1092
 Pope Cyril III of Alexandria, ruled in 1235–1243
 Pope Cyril IV of Alexandria, ruled in 1854–1961
 Pope Cyril V of Alexandria, ruled in 1874–1927
 Pope Cyril VI of Alexandria, ruled in 1959–1971